Pevsner or Pevzner is a Jewish surname. Notable people with the surname include: 

 Aihud Pevsner (1925–2018), American physicist
 Antoine Pevsner (1886–1962), Russian sculptor, brother of Naum Gabo
 David Pevsner, American actor, singer, dancer and writer
 Keren Pevzner (born 1961), Israeli writer
 Nikolaus Pevsner (1902–1983), German-born British historian and critic of art and architecture
 Pavel A. Pevzner, computer scientist
 Shmuel Pevzner (1878–1930), Russian-born Jewish writer and industrialist 
 Stella Pevsner, author of children's books
 Tom Pevsner (1926–2014), German-born British film producer, son of Nikolaus

Fictional people
"Baldy" Pevsner, legendary player for Neasden FC, in the North Circular Relegation League, as depicted in Private Eye